The grey-sided thrush (Turdus feae) is a species of bird in the thrush family, Turdidae.

Description
The grey-sided thrush is a medium-sized, warm-brown thrush with a white  and crescent below the eye. The female has a white throat and whiter centre to the breast and belly, some dark spots or streaks on the sides of the throat and upper breast and warm brownish fringes to the breast feathers.

Distribution and habitat
The species is migratory, breeding in the mountains of north-east China and migrating to subtropical or tropical moist montane forest in India, and Indochina. Lately it has also been found in parts of Daman, Makwanpur; Nepal and as a vagrant in north-eastern Bangladesh.

Behaviour and ecology
The grey-sided thrush forages for insects and berries on the ground or less commonly in the trees, often in the company of the eyebrowed thrush (Turdus obscurus). It is also thought to feed on nectar from the flowers of the shingle tree (Acrocarpus fraxinifolius) It is threatened by habitat loss and habitat fragmentation.

References

grey-sided thrush
Birds of China
grey-sided thrush
Taxonomy articles created by Polbot